White Star or Whitestar may refer to:

 Any star with a suitable spectral type
 WhiteStarUML, a UML modeling tool
 White Star (cider), a brand of British white cider
 White Star (horse), a show horse
 White Star Line, a steamship company
 Whitestar, a common name for the morning glory species Ipomoea lacunosa
 White Star Woluwé F.C., a football club in Belgium
 FBC White Star, a football club in Peru
 Operation White Star, name for the U.S. military assistance program to Laos from 1959-1962
 The Order of the White Star of Estonia
 Tesla Model S, previously codename Whitestar, a Tesla Motors electric sedan
 Wisła Kraków, a football club in Poland, nicknamed the White Star
 White Star, Kentucky
 White Star, Saskatchewan
 ☆ or U+2606, a Unicode character